The 2011 Copa Latina was the third edition of the annual women's volleyball tournament, organized by the Peruvian Volleyball Federation and Frecuencia Latina, played by four countries from May 27-30, 2011 in Coliseo Miguel Grau at Callao, Peru.

Competing Nations

Purpose
 participated in the tournament to test a new Coach, Luca Cristofani and as preparation for the 2011 World Grand Prix.
 participated in the tournament to test the team that would play at the London Olympics as host.
 participated in the tournament as preparation for their first participation at a Pan-American Cup in the 2011 edition of the tournament.
 participated in the tournament as preparation for the 2011 World Grand Prix.

Preliminary round

|}

Matches

|}

Final round

Bronze medal match

|}

Gold medal match

|}

Final standing

References

P
V
Volleyball